Bratki is a rural locality (a selo) and the administrative center of Bratkovskoye Rural Settlement, Ternovsky District, Voronezh Oblast, Russia. The population was 1,095 as of 2018. There are 23 streets.

Geography 
Bratki is located 14 km southwest of Ternovka (the district's administrative centre) by road. Kostino-Otdelets is the nearest rural locality.

References 

Rural localities in Ternovsky District